Sher Shivraj is a 2022 Indian Marathi-language historical action drama film directed by Digpal Lanjekar and produced by Chinmay Mandlekar, Digpal Lanjekar, Nitin Keni, Pradyot Pendharkar and Anil Warkhade. The film based on the life of Maratha king, Shivaji where he defeated Afzal Khan with brilliant tactics and courage stars Chinmay Mandlekar in titular role, Mrinal Kulkarni, Ajay Purkar, Mukesh Rishi along with Bipin Surve and Rohan Mankani in supporting roles. The film was released theatrically on 22 April 2022. It is the fourth movie of the series in an eight-movie series on Maratha Empire. It will be followed by Subhedar movie.

With the launch of trailer of the film through Metaverse, it became the first Marathi film trailer to be shown through Metaverse technology.

Synopsis 
It is the story of great Maratha king, Shivaji maharaj where he defeated Afzal Khan with brilliant tactics and courages. It also focuses on psychological techniques Maharaj exhibited during the mission.

Cast 
Source:
 Chinmay Mandlekar as Chhatrapati Shivaji Maharaj
 Mrinal Kulkarni as Rajmata Jijabai
 Ravindra Mankani as Shahajiraje
 Mukesh Rishi as Afzalkhan
 Mrunmayee Deshpande as Kesarbai  
 Rohan Mankani as Randullah Khan
 Bipin Surve as Baji Sarjerao Jedhe
 Ajay Purkar as Subhedar Tanaji Malusare
 Varsha Usgaonkar as Badi Begum
 Digpal Lanjekar as Bahirji Naik
 Sameer Dharmadhikari as Kanhoji Jedhe
 Dipti Ketkar as Matoshri Dipaiau Bandal
 Isha Keskar as Matoshri Sai Bhonsale
 Madhavi Neemkar as Matoshri Soyarabai
 Nikhil Lanjekar as Narveer Jivaji Mahale
 Sushruta Mankani as Yesaji Kank
 Astad Kale as Vishwas Dighe
 Akshay Waghmare as Pilaji Gole
 Rishi Saxena as Fazal Khan
 Sangram Salvi as Yakut Khan
 Bipin Surve as Sarjerao Jedhe
 Vaibhav Mangle as Gopinath Pant Bokila
 Vikram Gaikwad as Sarnobat Netaji Palkar
 Sachin Bhilare as Aaginya
 Sachin Deshpande as Moropant
 Alka Kubal as Tulja Bhavani (Guest appearance)
 Kunal Dhumal as Kondaji Kank

Soundtrack

Soundtrack of the film is composed by Devdutta Manisha Baji and lyrics are written by Digpal Lanjekar and Santsreshtra Tukaram Maharaj. In track "He Shaktipeeth Nayike" traditional lyrics have been used.

Reception

Critical response
Mihir Bhanage of The Times of India gave 3 stars out of 5, and  praised the performances of
Chinmay Mandlekar, Mukesh Rishi,  Sameer Dharmadhikari, Ajay Purkar, Mrinal Kulkarni, Vaibhav Mangle, Isha Keskar and Digpal Lanjekar. He stated, "these actors take the experience of watching this film a notch higher." He also appreciated the songs and special effects. He wrote, "songs are good, particularly Shivba Raja". Concluding the review he wrote "the film is a decent watch, that deserves to be watched on the big screen for the atmosphere it creates."

Box office
Sher Shivraj had a decent start on its opening day collected  crore on the opening day of its release in Maharashtra.

 the film has grossed  crore and was at Hit at box office.

Release

Theatrical
The film was released in cinemas on 22 April 2022.

Home media
The film was digitally streamed on Amazon Prime Video from 30 May 2022.

References 

Reviews: Sher Shivraj: Swari Afzal Khan Reviews | Movierevision

External links
 

2022 films
Indian historical drama films
2020s historical drama films
2020s Marathi-language films
Films set in the Maratha Empire
2022 drama films